The men's doubles tournament at the 1991 US Open was held from August 26 to September 8, 1991, on the outdoor hard courts of the USTA National Tennis Center in New York City, United States. John Fitzgerald and Anders Järryd won the title, defeating Scott Davis and David Pate in the final.

Seeds

Draw

Finals

Top half

Section 1

Section 2

Bottom half

Section 3

Section 4

External links
 Main draw
1991 US Open – Men's draws and results at the International Tennis Federation

Men's Doubles
US Open (tennis) by year – Men's doubles